Péter Kiss (1959–2014) was a Hungarian Socialist politician.

Peter Kiss or Péter Kiss may also refer to:

 Peter Kiss (basketball) (born 1997), American college basketball player
 Péter Kiss (mathematician) (1937–2002), Hungarian mathematician
 Péter Kiss (mountaineer) (1986–2013), Hungarian mountaineer
 Péter Pál Kiss (born 2003), Hungarian paracanoeist

See also 
 Asteroid 199688 Kisspéter, named after the aforementioned mountaineer